The surname Williamson was first found in the Royal burgh of Peebles, where this predominantly Scottish Clan held a Family Seat anciently, although their interests straddled the English Scottish border and they held territories as far south as Keswick in Cumberland.

List of persons with the surname
 Al Williamson (baseball) (1900–1978), American baseball player
 Al Williamson (1931–2010), American cartoonist
 Albert Williamson (1866after 1891), English footballer
 Alexander William Williamson (1824–1904), British chemist
 Alexander Williamson (missionary) (1829–1890), Scottish missionary
 Alf Williamson (1893–1917), Australian Rules footballer
 Alice Muriel Williamson (1869–1933), British novelist; wife of Charles Norris Williamson
 Alison Williamson (born 1971), British archer
 Alix Williamson (1916–2001), American publicist
 Allen Williamson (fl. 1970), American politician
 Andrew Williamson (judge) (born 1946), Manx lawyer and government official
 Andrew Williamson (soldier) (c. 1730–1786) Scottish–born American soldier
 Anna Williamson (born 1981), British TV presenter
 Archibald Williamson (1892-1972), English cricketer
 Arthur Williamson (1930–2020), Scottish footballer
 Benedict Williamson (1868–1948), British architect and Catholic priest
 Benjamin Williamson (mathematician) (1827–1916), Irish mathematical physicist
 Bobby Williamson (born 1961), Scottish football player and manager
 Bree Williamson (born 1979), Canadian actress
 Byron Dale Williamson (born 1946), American book publisher
 Charles Williamson (disambiguation), several people
 Chris Williamson (disambiguation), multiple people
 Clara McDonald Williamson (1875–1976), American painter
 Corliss Williamson (born 1973), American basketball player
 Craig Williamson (born 1949), South African apartheid-era police officer
 David Williamson (disambiguation), several people
 Delano E. Williamson (1822-1903), Indiana Attorney General
 Dominic Williamson (born 1975), English cricketer
 Donald I. Williamson (1922–2016), British planktonologist
 Elizabeth Williamson, professor of pharmacy
 Eric Miles Williamson (born 1961), American novelist
 Emily Williamson (1855–1936), English philanthropist
Felix D. Williamson (1921–1947), American World War II flying ace
 Francis John Williamson (1833–1920), British portrait sculptor
 Gavin Williamson (born 1976), British politician
 Geordie Williamson (born 1981), Australian mathematician
 Harold Williamson (disambiguation), several people
 Sir Hedworth Williamson, 7th Baronet (1797–1861), British politician 
 Sir Hedworth Williamson, 8th Baronet (1827–1900), British politician
 Henry Williamson (1895–1977), British novelist
 Henry Charles Williamson (1871-1949), Scottish pioneer of marine biology
 Herbert Williamson (1871–1946), English football goalkeeper
 Hugh Williamson (disambiguation), several people
 James Williamson (disambiguation), several people
 Jack Williamson (1908–2006), American science fiction writer
 John Williamson (disambiguation), several people
 Johnny Williamson (1929–2021), English footballer
 Johnny Williamson (1895–1979), Scottish footballer
 Joseph Williamson (disambiguation), several people
 Kane Williamson (born 1990), New Zealand cricketer
 Kenneth Williamson (1914–1977), British ornithologist
 Kevin Williamson (disambiguation), several people
 Kramer Williamson (died 2013), American sprint car racing driver
 Lambert Williamson (1907–1975), British composer of film scores
 Leah Williamson (born 1997), English association footballer
 Lee Williamson (American football) (born 1968), American football player
 Linda Williamson (born 1952), American politician
 Lionel Williamson (born 1944), Australian rugby league footballer
 Malcolm Williamson (1931–2003), Australian composer
 Malcolm J. Williamson, British mathematician and cryptographer
 Marianne Williamson (born 1952), American spiritual activist, author, and lecturer
 Mark Williamson (disambiguation), several people
 Martha Williamson (born 1955), American television writer, producer, author, activist, Christian
 Martha Burton Williamson (1843–1922), American malacologist and journalist 
 Matthew Williamson (born 1971), British fashion designer
 Maurice Williamson (born 1951), New Zealand politician
 Michael Williamson (disambiguation), multiple people
 Moses O. Williamson (1850–1935), American politician
 Ned Williamson (1857–1895), American professional baseball player
 Nicholas Williamson, English secret agent, arrested in 1595
 Nicol Williamson (1936–2011), Scottish actor
 Norman Williamson (born 1969), jockey
 Norris C. Williamson (1874–1949), American politician
 Oliver E. Williamson (1932-2020), American economist
 Paul Williamson (born 1948), retired Anglo-Catholic clergyman and controversialist
 Pliny W. Williamson (1876–1958), New York state senator
 Pooh Williamson (born 1973), American basketball player and coach
 Richard Williamson (disambiguation), several people
 Robert Wood Williamson (1856–1932), British solicitor and anthropologist
 Robin Williamson (born 1943), Scottish singer-songwriter and guitarist
 Robin C. N. Williamson (born 1942), president of the Royal Society of Medicine
 Roger Williamson (1948–1973), English Formula 1 driver
 Ron Williamson (1953-2004), American baseball player wrongly convicted of rape and murder
 Roy Williamson (1936–1990), Scottish songwriter, most notably of The Corries
 Roy Williamson (bishop) (1932–2019), English clergyman
 Samuel Williamson (disambiguation), several people
 Shirley Williamson (1875–1944), painter and printmaker
 Sonny Boy Williamson (disambiguation), several people
 Stephen F. Williamson, United States Naval Officer
 Timothy Williamson (born 1955), British philosopher
 Troy Williamson (born 1983), American football wide receiver
 Troy Williamson (boxer) (born 1991), British boxer
 Wally Williamson (1907–1965), Australian footballer
 Sir Walter James Franklin Williamson (1867–1954), British civil servant and naturalist
 William Williamson (disambiguation), several people
 Zion Williamson (born 2000), American basketball player
 Barney Dale Williamson,(born 1980) American actor,singer,songwriter

See also
 Allen Williamson Bridge, road bridge in Payne County, Oklahoma
 Clan Gunn, related family
 

Patronymic surnames
English-language surnames
Surnames from given names